Zbrašín is a municipality and village in Louny District in the Ústí nad Labem Region of the Czech Republic. It has about 400 inhabitants.

Administrative parts
Villages of Hořany and Senkov are administrative parts of Zbrašín.

References

Villages in Louny District